Margaret Fox (1833–1893) and her sisters were noted 19th-century spiritualists.

Margaret Fox may also refer to:
Margaret Fell (1614–1702), Quaker leader 
Margaret R. Fox  (1916–2006), American computer scientist
Margaret Taylor Fox (1857–c. 1941), American artist
Margaret Ellen Fox, American girl who disappeared in 1974